Addison Mitchell McConnell III (born February 20, 1942) is an American politician and retired attorney serving his seventh term as the senior United States senator from Kentucky, which he has held since 1985. McConnell is the Senate leader of the Republican Party, having served as minority leader since 2021 and previously from 2007 to 2015, and as majority leader from 2015 to 2021.

McConnell first served as a Deputy United States Assistant Attorney General under President Gerald Ford from 1974 until 1975 and went on to serve as Jefferson County Judge/Executive from 1977 until 1984 in his home state of Kentucky. McConnell was first elected to the U.S. Senate in 1984 and is the second Kentuckian to serve as a party leader in the Senate. During the 1998 and 2000 election cycles, he was chairman of the National Republican Senatorial Committee. He was elected Majority Whip in the 108th Congress and re-elected to the post in 2004. In November 2006 he was elected Senate minority leaderthe post he held until Republicans took control of the Senate in 2015.

McConnell holds conservative political positions, although he was known as a pragmatist and a moderate Republican early in his political career. He led opposition to stricter campaign finance laws, culminating in the U.S. Supreme Court ruling Citizens United v. FEC that partially overturned the Bipartisan Campaign Reform Act (McCain-Feingold) in 2010. McConnell worked to withhold Republican support for major presidential initiatives during the Obama administration, having made frequent use of the filibuster, and blocked many of President Obama's judicial nominees, including Supreme Court nominee Merrick Garland. 

During the Trump administration, the Senate Republican majority under his leadership passed the Tax Cuts and Jobs Act of 2017, the Economic Growth, Regulatory Relief and Consumer Protection Act in 2018, the First Step Act, and confirmed a record number of federal appeals court judges during a president's first two years.  McConnell invoked the "nuclear option" to eliminate the 60-vote requirement to end a filibuster for Supreme Court nominations, after his predecessor Harry Reid had previously eliminated the filibuster for all other presidential nominations; Trump subsequently won confirmation battles on Neil Gorsuch, Brett Kavanaugh and Amy Coney Barrett for the Supreme Court. While supportive of many of Trump's domestic and foreign policies, McConnell was critical of Trump's attempts to overturn the 2020 presidential election, and despite voting to acquit on Trump's second impeachment trial on reasons related to the constitutionality of impeaching a former president, deemed him "practically and morally responsible" for the January 6 United States Capitol attack.

McConnell is married to former secretary of transportation and former secretary of labor Elaine Chao. In 2015 and 2019, Time listed McConnell as one of the 100 most influential people in the world.

Early life and education (1942–1967)

McConnell was born on February 20, 1942, to Julia Odene "Dean" ( Shockley; 1919–1993) and Addison Mitchell "A.M." McConnell II (1917–1990). McConnell was born in Sheffield, Alabama, and grew up in nearby Athens, Alabama, where his grandfather, Robert Hayes McConnell Sr., and his great uncle, Addison Mitchell McConnell, owned McConnell Funeral Home. He is of Scots-Irish and English descent. One of his ancestors fought on the American side in the American Revolutionary War.

In 1944, at the age of two, McConnell's upper left leg was paralyzed by a polio attack. He received treatment at the Roosevelt Warm Springs Institute for Rehabilitation. The treatment potentially saved him from being disabled for the rest of his life. McConnell said his family "almost went broke" because of costs related to his illness.

In 1950, when he was eight, McConnell moved with his family from Athens to Augusta, Georgia, where his father, who was in the Army, was stationed at Fort Gordon.

In 1956, his family moved to Louisville, Kentucky, where he attended duPont Manual High School. McConnell was elected student council president at his high school during his junior year. He graduated Omicron Delta Kappa from the University of Louisville with a B.A. in political science in 1964 with honors. He was president of the Student Council of the College of Arts and Sciences and a member of the Phi Kappa Tau fraternity.

McConnell attended the 1963 March on Washington for Jobs and Freedom, where Martin Luther King Jr. gave the "I Have a Dream" speech. In 1964, at the age of 22, he attended civil rights rallies, and interned with Senator John Sherman Cooper. He has said his time with Cooper inspired him to run for the Senate later in life.

In 1967, McConnell graduated from the University of Kentucky College of Law, where he was president of the Student Bar Association.

Early career (1967–1984)
In March 1967, shortly before the expiration of his educational draft deferment upon graduation from law school, McConnell enlisted in the U.S. Army Reserve as a private at Louisville, Kentucky. This was a coveted position because the Reserve units were mostly kept out of combat during the Vietnam War. His first day of training at Fort Knox, Kentucky, was July 9, 1967, two days after taking the bar exam, and his last day was August 15, 1967. Shortly after his arrival, he was diagnosed with optic neuritis and was deemed medically unfit for military service. After five weeks at Fort Knox, he was honorably discharged. His brief time in service has repeatedly been put at issue by his political opponents during his electoral campaigns.

From 1968 to 1970, McConnell worked as chief legislative assistant to Senator Marlow Cook in Washington, D.C., managing a legislative department consisting of five members as well as assisting with speech writing and constituent services.

In 1971, McConnell returned to Louisville, where he worked for Tom Emberton's candidacy for Governor of Kentucky, which was unsuccessful. McConnell attempted to run for a seat in the state legislature but was disqualified because he did not meet the residency requirements for the office. He then went to work for a Louisville law firm,  Segal, Isenberg, Sales and Stewart, for a few years. During the same time period, he taught a night class on political science at the University of Louisville.

In October 1974, McConnell returned to Washington to fill a position as Deputy Assistant Attorney General under President Gerald Ford, where he worked alongside Robert Bork, Laurence Silberman, and Antonin Scalia. He also served as acting United States Assistant Attorney General for the Office of Legislative Affairs under President Ford in 1975.  

In 1977, McConnell was elected the Jefferson County judge/executive, the top political office in Jefferson County, Kentucky, at the time, defeating incumbent Democrat Todd Hollenbach, III, 53% to 47%. He was re-elected in 1981 against Jefferson County Commissioner Jim "Pop" Malone, 51% to 47%, outspending Malone 3–1, and occupied this office until his election to the U.S. Senate in 1984.

U.S. Senate (1985–present)

In his early years as a politician in Kentucky, McConnell was known as a pragmatist and a moderate Republican. Over time he shifted to the right and became more conservative. According to one of his biographers, McConnell transformed "from a moderate Republican who supported abortion rights and public employee unions to the embodiment of partisan obstructionism and conservative orthodoxy on Capitol Hill." McConnell has widely been described as an obstructionist.

From 1997 to 2001, McConnell was chairman of the National Republican Senatorial Committee, the body charged with securing electoral victories for Republicans. On February 12, 1999, he was one of fifty senators to vote to convict and remove Bill Clinton from office. He was first elected as Majority Whip in the 108th Congress and was unanimously re-elected on November 17, 2004. Senate Majority Leader Bill Frist did not seek re-election in the 2006 elections. In November, after Republicans lost control of the Senate, they elected McConnell as the minority leader. After Republicans took control of the Senate following the 2014 Senate elections, McConnell became the Senate Majority Leader. In June 2018 he became the longest-serving Senate Republican leader in the history of the United States. McConnell is the second Kentuckian to serve as a party leader in the Senate (after Alben W. Barkley led the Democrats from 1937 to 1949) and is the longest-serving U.S. senator from Kentucky in history.

McConnell has a reputation as a skilled political strategist and tactician. This reputation dimmed after Republicans failed to repeal the Affordable Care Act (Obamacare) in 2017 during consolidated Republican control of government.

McConnell regularly obtained earmarks for businesses and institutions in Kentucky, until the practice was banned by Congress in 2010. McConnell has received criticism for funding "temporary patches" to Kentucky's long-term healthcare problems, while simultaneously opposing and obstructing national programs that seek to improve healthcare more systematically, such as Obamacare and Medicaid expansion.

Relationships with presidential administrations

Obama
As the leading Republican senator, McConnell confronted and pressured other Republican senators who were willing to negotiate with Democrats and the Obama administration. According to Purdue University political scientist Bert A. Rockman, "pure party line voting has been evident now for some time... but rarely has the tactic of 'oppositionism' been so boldly stated as McConnell did." According to University of Texas legal scholar Sanford Levinson, McConnell learned that obstruction and Republican unity were the optimal ways to ensure Republican gains in upcoming elections after he observed how Democratic cooperation with the Bush administration on No Child Left Behind and Medicare Part D helped Bush's 2004 re-election. Levinson noted, "McConnell altogether rationally... concluded that Republicans have nothing to gain, as a political party, from collaborating in anything that the president could then claim as an achievement." A number of political scientists, historians, and legal scholars have characterized McConnell's obstructionism and constitutional hardball as contributors to democratic erosion in the United States.

In October 2010, McConnell said "the single most important thing we want to achieve is for President Obama to be a one-term president." Asked whether this meant "endless, or at least frequent, confrontation with the president", McConnell clarified that "if [Obama is] willing to meet us halfway on some of the biggest issues, it's not inappropriate for us to do business with him." According to political scientists Jacob Hacker and Paul Pierson, "Facing off against Obama, [McConnell] worked to deny even minimal Republican support for major presidential initiativesinitiatives that were, as a rule, in keeping with the moderate model of decades past, and often with moderate Republican stances of a few years past." The New York Times noted early during Obama's administration that "on the major issuesnot just health care, but financial regulation and the economic stimulus package, among othersMr. McConnell has held Republican defections to somewhere between minimal and nonexistent, allowing him to slow the Democratic agenda if not defeat aspects of it." The Republican caucus threatened repeatedly to force the United States to default on its debt, McConnell saying he had learned from the 2011 debt-ceiling crisis that "it's a hostage that's worth ransoming."

McConnell worked to delay and obstruct health care reform and banking reform, two of the most notable pieces of legislation that Democrats navigated through Congress early in Obama's tenure. Political scientists noted that "by slowing action even on measures supported by many Republicans, McConnell capitalized on the scarcity of floor time, forcing Democratic leaders into difficult trade-offs concerning which measures were worth pursuing.... Slowing the Senate's ability to process even routine measures limited the sheer volume of liberal bills that could be adopted."

Use of the filibuster
One of McConnell's most common tactics as minority leader to delay or obstruct legislation and judicial appointments has been the filibuster. A filibuster is an attempt to "talk a bill to death", forcing Senate leadership to abandon a proposed measure instead of waiting out the filibuster―or at least to delay the measure's passage. In the United States Senate, any senator may speak for unlimited duration unless a 60-person majority votes to invoke cloture, or end debate, and proceed to a final vote. Political scientists have referred to McConnell's use of the filibuster as "constitutional hardball", referring to the misuse of procedural tools in a way that undermines democracy.

Political scientists Hacker and Pierson describe the rationale behind McConnell's filibusters, "Filibusters left no fingerprints. When voters heard that legislation had been 'defeated', journalists rarely highlighted that this defeat meant a minority had blocked a majority. Not only did this strategy produce an atmosphere of gridlock and dysfunction; it also chewed up the Senate calendar, restricting the range of issues on which Democrats could progress."

In 2012, McConnell proposed a measure allowing President Obama to raise the debt ceiling, hoping some Democratic senators would oppose the measure, thus demonstrating disunity among Democrats. However, all Democratic senators supported the proposal, which led McConnell to filibuster his own proposal.

In 2013, Senate Majority Leader Harry Reid eliminated the filibuster for all presidential nominations except the Supreme Court. By that time, nearly half of all votes to invoke cloture in the history of the Senate had occurred during Obama's presidency. In April 2017, Senate Republicans led by McConnell eliminated the filibuster for Supreme Court nominations in order to end debate on the nomination of Neil Gorsuch. In August 2019, McConnell wrote an editorial for The New York Times, strongly opposing the elimination of the filibuster on legislation.

Trump 

McConnell initially endorsed fellow Kentucky senator Rand Paul during the 2016 presidential campaign. Paul withdrew from the race following the Iowa caucus, and McConnell endorsed presumptive nominee Donald Trump on May 4, 2016. However, McConnell disagreed with Trump on multiple subsequent occasions. In May 2016, after Trump suggested that federal judge Gonzalo P. Curiel was biased against Trump because of his Mexican heritage, McConnell responded, "I don't agree with what he (Trump) had to say. This is a man who was born in Indiana. All of us came here from somewhere else." In July 2016, after Trump had criticized the parents of Capt. Humayun Khan, a Muslim-American soldier who was killed in Iraq, McConnell said, "All Americans should value the patriotic service of the patriots who volunteer to selflessly defend us in the armed services." On October 7, 2016, following the Donald Trump Access Hollywood controversy, McConnell said, "As the father of three daughters, I strongly believe that Trump needs to apologize directly to women and girls everywhere, and take full responsibility for the utter lack of respect for women shown in his comments on that tape." In private, McConnell reportedly expresses disdain for Trump and "abhors" his behavior.

In October 2017, White House chief strategist Stephen Bannon and other Trump allies blamed McConnell for stalling the Trump administration's legislation. In response, McConnell cited the confirmation of Neil Gorsuch to the Supreme Court to show that the Senate was supportive of Trump's agenda.

After Joe Biden won the election of 2020 against Donald Trump, McConnell at first refused to recognize Biden as the winner of the election. In his public statements, McConnell did not repeat any of Trump's false claims of voter fraud, but did not contradict them, ignoring questions about evidence and instead arguing that Trump had the right to challenge the results. At the same time that McConnell refused to recognize Biden, he did celebrate Republicans who won their races in the Senate and the House in the same elections.

On December 15, one day after the electoral college vote, McConnell reversed his previous stance and publicly acknowledged Biden's win, stating "Today, I want to congratulate President-elect Joe Biden." On January 6, during the Electoral College vote count, McConnell spoke out against the efforts of Trump and his allies to overturn the election: 

Later that day, he described the storming of the Capitol building (which occurred while the Electoral College votes were being counted) as a "failed insurrection" which "tried to disrupt our democracy".

On April 10, 2021, Trump called McConnell a "dumb son of a bitch". Trump added: "I hired his wife. Did he ever say thank you?" Trump has continued to attack McConnell in personal terms since then, but McConnell has not responded publicly.

First impeachment

On November 5, 2019, as the House of Representatives began public hearings on the impeachment of President Trump, McConnell said, "I'm pretty sure how [an impeachment trial is] likely to end.... If it were today, I don't think there's any questionit would not lead to a removal."

On December 14, 2019, McConnell met with White House counsel Pat Cipollone and White House legislative affairs director Eric Ueland. Later that day, McConnell declared that for Trump's impeachment trial, he would be in "total coordination with the White House counsel's office" and Trump's representatives. He also declared that there was "no chance" the Senate would convict Trump and remove him from office.

On December 17, 2019, McConnell rejected a request to call four witnesses for Trump's impeachment trial because, according to McConnell, the Senate's role was to "act as judge and jury", not to investigate. Later that day, McConnell told the media: "I'm not an impartial juror [in this impeachment trial]. This is a political process. There's not anything judicial about it."

After Trump's acquittal, McConnell was noted for his ability to block witnesses, to secure Trump's acquittal, and to maintain party unity during the impeachment process. Commentators noted that McConnell had kept Republican senators "marching in lockstep" throughout the process.

Second impeachment

On January 12, 2021, it was reported that McConnell supported impeaching Trump for his role in inciting the 2021 storming of the United States Capitol, believing it would make it easier for Republicans to purge the party of Trump and rebuild the party. On January 13, despite having the authority to call for an emergency meeting of the Senate to hold the Senate trial, McConnell did not reconvene the chamber, claiming unanimous consent was required. McConnell called for delaying the Senate trial until after Joe Biden's inauguration. Once the Senate trial started, McConnell voted to acquit Trump on February 13, 2021, and said it was unconstitutional to convict someone who was no longer in office.

The vote was a bipartisan majority (57–43) but not enough to pass the two-thirds threshold. After the vote McConnell lambasted and condemned Trump, despite his vote to acquit, in a 20-minute speech on the floor of the Senate, saying he believes Trump to be guilty of everything alleged by the House managers. He stated that:

Former President Trump's actions preceding the riot were a disgraceful dereliction of duty... There is no question that President Trump is practically and morally responsible for provoking the events of that day... If President Trump were still in office, I would have carefully considered whether the House managers proved their specific charge.

McConnell also said that Trump remains subject to the country's criminal and civil laws, stating, "He didn't get away with anything yet." He also said why he voted to acquit: "ArticleII, Section4 must have force. It tells us the President, Vice President, and civil officers may be impeached and convicted. Donald Trump is no longer the president. Clearly that mandatory sentence cannot be applied to somebody who has left office. The entire process revolves around removal. If removal becomes impossible, conviction becomes insensible."

In 2021, McConnell sought to organize Republican Senators into filibustering a bipartisan commission to investigate the storming of the Capitol on January 6.

On May 28, 2021, McConnell voted against creating an independent commission to investigate the January 6 United States Capitol attack.

Biden
McConnell's relationship with the Biden administration has been portrayed in media as one of comity. Biden has described McConnell as "a friend, colleague and 'man of his word.'" McConnell, for his part, has praised bipartisan legislation they worked on together, and had been the only Republican to attend the funeral of Biden's son, Beau (in 2015).

Judicial nominees

Under Obama

Throughout Obama's tenure McConnell led Senate Republicans in what has been called "a disciplined, sustained, at times underhanded campaign to deny the Democratic president the opportunity to appoint federal judges". In June 2009, following President Obama's nominating Sonia Sotomayor as Associate Justice, McConnell and Jeff Sessions opined that Sotomayor's seventeen years as a federal judge and over 3,600 judicial opinions would require lengthy review and advocated against Democrats hastening the confirmation process. On July 17, McConnell announced that he would vote against Sotomayor's confirmation. In August, McConnell called Sotomayor "a fine person with an impressive story and a distinguished background" but added he did not believe she would withhold her personal or political views while serving as a justice. Sotomayor was confirmed days later.

In May 2010, after President Obama nominated Elena Kagan to succeed the retiring John Paul Stevens, McConnell said during a Senate speech that Americans wanted to make sure Kagan would be independent of influence from White House as an associate justice and noted Obama's referring to Kagan as a friend of his in announcing her nomination. McConnell announced his opposition to Kagan's confirmation, saying she was not forthcoming enough about her "views on basic principles of American constitutional law". Kagan was confirmed the following month.

In 2014, Republicans gained control of the Senate, and McConnell became majority leader; he used his newly heightened power to start what was considered "a near blockade of Obama's judicial appointments." According to The New York Times, Obama's final two years as president saw 18 district court judges and one appeals court judge confirmed, the fewest since President Harry S. Truman. In comparison, the final two years of the presidencies of George W. Bush, Bill Clinton, and Ronald Reagan had between 55 and 70 district court judges each confirmed and between 10 and 15 appeals court judges confirmed. According to the Los Angeles Times, McConnell brought about an "extraordinary two-year slowdown in judicial confirmations," detailing 22 confirmations of Obama's judicial nominees, the lowest since President Truman in 1951–1952. The number of federal judicial vacancies more than doubled comparing the figure near the end of Obama's term to the figure at the end of George W. Bush's term. Later in a 2019 interview, McConnell credited himself for the large number of judicial vacancies created in the last two years of Obama's presidency.

On February 13, 2016, Supreme Court justice Antonin Scalia died. Shortly thereafter, McConnell issued a statement indicating that the U.S. Senate would not consider any Supreme Court nominee put forth by Obama. "The American people should have a voice in the selection of their next Supreme Court justice. Therefore, this vacancy should not be filled until we have a new president," McConnell said at the time. On March 16, 2016, President Obama nominated Merrick Garland, a Judge of the D.C. Circuit Court of Appeals, to the Supreme Court. Under McConnell's direction, Senate Republicans refused to take any action on the Garland nomination. Garland's nomination expired on January 3, 2017, with the end of the 114th Congress.

In an August 2016 speech in Kentucky, McConnell made reference to the Garland nomination, saying that "one of my proudest moments was when I looked Barack Obama in the eye and I said, 'Mr. President, you will not fill the Supreme Court vacancy.'" In April 2018, McConnell said the decision not to act upon the Garland nomination was "the most consequential decision I've made in my entire public career". McConnell's refusal to hold Senate hearings on Supreme Court nominee Merrick Garland during Obama's final year in office was described by political scientists and legal scholars as "unprecedented", a "culmination of [his] confrontational style", a "blatant abuse of constitutional norms", and a "classic example of constitutional hardball".

Under Trump

In January 2017, Republican president Donald Trump nominated Neil Gorsuch to fill the Supreme Court vacancy left after Scalia's death. Gorsuch's nomination was confirmed on April 7, 2017, after McConnell eliminated the filibuster on Supreme Court nominees.

On July 18, 2018, with Andy Oldham's Senate confirmation, Senate Republicans broke a record for largest number of appeals court judiciary confirmations during a president's first two years; Oldham became the 23rd appeals court judge confirmed in Trump's term. McConnell said he considers the judiciary to be the item of Trump's first two years with the longest-lasting impact on the country. The record for the number of circuit court judges confirmed during a president's first year was broken in 2017, while the previous two-year record took place under President George H. W. Bush, and included 22 nominations. By March 2020, McConnell had contacted an unknown number of judges, encouraging them to retire prior to the 2020 election. He confirmed 260 federal judges over the course of Trump's four-year term, shifting the federal judiciary to the right.

In July 2018, President Trump nominated Brett Kavanaugh to replace the retiring Anthony Kennedy as an associate justice of the Supreme Court. McConnell accused Democrats of creating an "extreme" distortion of Kavanaugh's record during his hearing process. In September 2018, Christine Blasey Ford publicly alleged that she had been sexually assaulted by Kavanaugh in 1982. After a report came out of Democrats' investigating a second allegation against Kavanaugh, McConnell said, "I want to make it perfectly clear.... Judge Kavanaugh will be voted on here on the Senate floor." Kavanaugh was confirmed on October 6. McConnell afterward admitted the confirmation process was a low point for the Senate, but also downplayed reports of dysfunction in the Senate; he said claims that the Senate was "somehow broken over this [were] simply inaccurate".

In October 2018, McConnell said if a Supreme Court vacancy were to occur during Trump's 2020 re-election year he would not follow his 2016 decision to let the winner of the upcoming presidential election nominate a justice. He noted that in 2016 the Senate was controlled by a party other than the president'sand argued that for that reason, the 2016 precedent was not applicable in 2020, when the presidency and Senate were both controlled by Republicans. In September 2020, following the death of Ruth Bader Ginsburg, he announced the Senate would vote on Trump's nominated replacement. On October 23, 2020, McConnell set in place the Senate debate for the confirmation of Amy Coney Barrett to fill Ginsburg's seat. Barrett was confirmed on October 26, 2020.

Government shutdowns
The United States federal government shut down October 1–17, 2013, following a failure to enact legislation to fund the government. McConnell later vowed Republicans would not force the U.S. to default on its debt or shut down the government in 2014, when stop-gap funding measures were set to expire. He also said he would not allow other Republicans to obstruct the budget-making process.

In July 2018, McConnell said funding for the Mexico–United States border wall would likely have to wait until the midterms had concluded. President Trump tweeted two days later that he was willing to allow a government shutdown to get funding. Several spending bills were approved that August; the approvals were seen as a victory for McConnell in his attempts to prevent another government shutdown.

Shutdown of 2018–2019
From December 22, 2018, until January 25, 2019, the federal government was shut down when Congress refused to give in to Trump's demand for $5.7billion in federal funds for a U.S.–Mexico border wall. In December 2018, the Republican-controlled Senate unanimously passed an appropriations bill without wall funding, and the bill appeared likely to be approved by the Republican-controlled House of Representatives and Trump. After Trump faced heavy criticism from some right-wing media outlets and pundits for appearing to back down on his campaign promise to "build the wall", he announced that he would not sign any appropriations bill that did not fund its construction.

During this shutdown, McConnell blocked the Senate from voting on appropriations legislation, and said it was not his place to mediate between the Senate and Trump. Privately, McConnell had advised Trump against initiating the shutdown. Democrats criticized McConnell for not putting appropriations legislation up for a vote, noting that the Republican-controlled Senate had unanimously passed an appropriations bill without wall funding and that the Senate could override Trump's veto.

By January 23, McConnell had blocked four Senate bills to reopen the government and a bill funding the Homeland Security Department through February 8. McConnell called for Democrats to support a Trump administration-backed measure that included $5.7billion in wall funding, together with a temporary extension of protections for DACA recipients, a Democratic priority. Privately, other Republican senators pressured McConnell to stop blocking appropriations legislation.

The shutdown ended on January 25, when President Trump signed a three-week funding measure reopening the government until February 15 without any funds for a border wall. This was the longest government shutdown in American history.

COVID-19 response
In response to the COVID-19 pandemic, McConnell initially opposed the Families First Coronavirus Response Act, calling it a Democratic "ideological wish list". He subsequently reversed his position when Trump endorsed the proposed package. The bill passed in the Senate by a vote of 90–8.

McConnell also directed Senate Republicans in negotiations for two other COVID-19 response packages: the Coronavirus Preparedness and Response Supplemental Appropriations Act, 2020, and the CARES Act. The CARES Act was the largest economic stimulus package in U.S. history, amounting to 10% of total U.S. gross domestic product. It passed both houses of Congress with bipartisan support.

Speaking on the Hugh Hewitt radio show on April 22, 2020, McConnell suggested that states should be able to declare bankruptcy instead of receiving additional COVID-19 aid fundsfunds which he implied would be used to save insolvent state pension funds, instead of COVID-19 relief as intended. His comments were met with sharp criticism from various state and local officials. States currently cannot declare bankruptcy.

After the passage of the CARES Act, McConnell waited several months before advancing any additional COVID-19 relief measures in the Senate, saying in May "I don't think we have yet felt the urgency of acting immediately," and that Congress should "[hit] pause" to evaluate how the allocated funds were working before approving more. In negotiations between congressional Democrats and White House officials for an additional aid package, McConnell was absent from the talks.

On September 10, a pared-down COVID-19 relief bill crafted by McConnell failed to advance the Senate past a Democratic filibuster. Democrats panned the bill as "completely inadequate" given the scope of the crisis brought on by the COVID-19and as a partisan maneuver to help Republican senators up for reelection. McConnell called the bill a choice between "do[ing] something" and "do[ing] nothing", and said he was holding the procedural vote to get lawmakers on the record about their willingness to compromise on COVID-19 legislation.

Approval ratings
As the leader of the Senate Republicans, McConnell has been at the receiving end of much of the criticism and disapproval that Republicans receive from Democratic voters, receiving near uniform disapproval from left-of-center voters. Furthermore, as a result of his unpopularity with Trump and the more populist base, McConnell has had historically low approval for a senator when looking at the electorate as a whole, as a 2012 poll and a 2016 poll each found that McConnell had the lowest home-state approval rating of any sitting senator. With a 49% disapproval rate in 2017, McConnell had the highest disapproval rating of all senators. 

In September 2019, the Morning Consult found that his approval rating had been underwater since the first quarter of 2017, when it was 44% positive and 47% negative. The best rating since that time was in the fourth quarter of 2018, when he had a 38% positive rating and a 47% negative rating among Kentuckians. At that time he was briefly not the least popular Senator, and was surpassed by Senators Claire McCaskill and Jeff Flake. As of the second quarter of 2019, however, McConnell's ratings were 36% positive and 50% negative. He netted −56 among Democrats, +29 among Republicans, and −24 among Independents. An average of polls by the Economist/YouGov, Politico/Morning Consult, and Harvard-Harris from the end of July through August 2019 (7/31–8/27), was 23% favorable and 48% unfavorable (−25.0 spread). 

In 2020, according to Morning Consult, Susan Collins edged out McConnell as the most unpopular senator with a 52% unfavorable rating from Maine voters compared to 50% unfavorable for McConnell.

Committee assignments
McConnell's committee assignments for the 118th Congress are as follows:
 Committee on Agriculture, Nutrition, and Forestry
 Subcommittee on Commodities, Risk Management, and Trade
 Subcommittee on Conservation, Climate, Forestry, and Natural Resources
 Subcommittee on Food and Nutrition, Specialty Crops, Organics, and Research
 Committee on Appropriations
 Subcommittee on Agriculture, Rural Development, Food and Drug Administration, and Related Agencies
 Subcommittee on Defense
 Subcommittee on Energy and Water Development
 Subcommittee on Interior, Environment, and Related Agencies
 Subcommittee on Military Construction and Veterans' Affairs, and Related Agencies
 Subcommittee on State, Foreign Operations, and Related Programs
 Committee on Rules and Administration
 Select Committee on Intelligence (Ex officio)

Caucuses
 Senate Republican Conference

Political positions

McConnell has taken conservative stances for the past several decades. During his Senate tenure, McConnell led opposition to stricter campaign finance laws, culminating in the Supreme Court ruling that partially overturned the Bipartisan Campaign Reform Act (McCain-Feingold) in 2010. He led opposition against Obamacare, first through efforts to delay or prevent the law's passage, and later to repeal or replace it, including via the American Healthcare Reform Act. McConnell has opposed stronger regulations, gun control measures and efforts to mitigate climate change. He has criticized proposed legislation by House Democrats such as the Green New Deal and Medicare for All, and was criticized by Nancy Pelosi for withholding votes on measures passed by the Democratic-controlled House during his time as Senate Majority Leader, including the For the People Act of 2019, the Equality Act and the Paycheck Fairness Act. McConnell has supported stronger border security, free trade agreements and reductions in taxes. As Senate Majority Leader, he led the passing of the Tax Cuts and Jobs Act of 2017 and the Economic Growth, Regulatory Relief and Consumer Protection Act in 2018. His foreign policy views have included support of sanctions on Cuba, Iran and Russia, opposition to the Iran nuclear deal and support of Israel. He voted for the Iraq Resolution, which authorized military action against Iraq, and supported the Iraq War troop surge of 2007 in public. 

Earlier in his political career, during the 1960s and 1970s, McConnell held moderate stances, including support of abortions, support of unions, and support of the civil rights movement.

Electoral history

1984

In 1984, McConnell ran for the U.S. Senate against two-term Democratic incumbent Walter Dee Huddleston. The election race was not decided until the last returns came in, when McConnell won by 3,437 votes out of more than 1.2 million votes cast, just over 0.4%. McConnell was the only Republican Senate challenger to win that year, despite Ronald Reagan's landslide victory in the presidential election.

McConnell's campaign was noted for a series of television campaign spots called "Where's Dee", which featured a group of bloodhounds trying to find Huddleston, implying that Huddleston's attendance record in the Senate was poor. He was the first Republican to win a statewide election in Kentucky since 1968, and benefited from the popularity of President Ronald Reagan, up for re-election, who was supported by 60% of Kentucky voters in the same year.

1990

In 1990, McConnell faced former Louisville Mayor Harvey I. Sloane, winning by 4.4%.

1996

In 1996, he defeated Steve Beshear by 12.6%, even as Bill Clinton narrowly carried the state. McConnell's campaign ran television ads warning voters to not "Get BeSheared" and included images of sheep being sheared.

2002

In 2002, he was unopposed in the Republican primary. He then defeated Lois Combs Weinberg by 29.4%.

2008

In 2008, McConnell faced his closest contest since 1990. He defeated Bruce Lunsford by 6%.

2014

In 2014, McConnell faced Louisville businessman Matt Bevin in the Republican primary. The 60.2% won by McConnell was the lowest voter support for a Kentucky U.S. senator in a primary since 1938. He faced Democratic Secretary of State Alison Lundergan Grimes in the general election, and defeated Grimes, 56.2–40.7%.

2020

In the November 2020 general election, McConnell faced Democratic nominee Amy McGrath, a former Marine fighter pilot; and Libertarian nominee Brad Barron, a businessman and farmer. During the campaign, McConnell and McGrath agreed to one hour-long, socially distanced debate on October 12. McConnell was elected to his seventh term on November3 when he defeated McGrath.

Personal life

Family 
McConnell is a Southern Baptist, baptized at age 8. He was married to his first wife, Sherrill Redmon, from 1968 to 1980 and had three daughters, Porter, Eleanor (Elly), and Claire. Porter McConnell is the campaign director for Take on Wall Street, a left-wing advocacy coalition. Following her divorce from McConnell, Redmon became a feminist scholar at Smith College and director of the Sophia Smith Collection. His second wife, whom he married in 1993, is Elaine Chao, Secretary of Labor under President George W. Bush and Secretary of Transportation under President Donald Trump.

In May 2019, McConnell's brother-in-law Gordon Hartogensis, who is married to Chao's sister Grace, was confirmed by the U.S. Senate as director of the Pension Benefit Guaranty Corporation (PBGC), a part of the Labor Department. McConnell voted to confirm.

Health and other activities 
In February 2003, McConnell underwent a triple heart bypass surgery in relation to blocked arteries at National Naval Medical Center in Bethesda, Maryland.

In 1997, he founded the James Madison Center for Free Speech, a Washington, D.C.-based legal defense organization. McConnell was inducted as a member of the Sons of the American Revolution on March 1, 2013. McConnell is on the Board of Selectors of Jefferson Awards for Public Service.

In 2018, the OpenSecrets website ranked McConnell one of the wealthiest members of the U.S. Senate, with a net worth of more than $25 million. His personal wealth was increased after receiving a 2008 personal gift to him and his wife, given by his father-in-law James S. C. Chao after the death of McConnell's mother-in-law, whose value has been estimated to be $5–25million.

In March 2023, McConnell was hospitalized after a fall, and was treated for a concussion.

In popular culture
McConnell's detractors have called him by a number of nicknames, including "Moscow Mitch", "Cocaine Mitch", the "Grim Reaper", "Darth Vader", "Rich Mitch", "Nuclear Mitch", "Midnight Mitch", and "Old Crow". McConnell is known to embrace several of them; however, he objected strenuously to the nickname "Moscow Mitch".

Host Jon Stewart repeatedly mocked McConnell on The Daily Show for his resemblance to a turtle or tortoise. McConnell has been portrayed by Beck Bennett in various sketches on Saturday Night Live. In 2017, McConnell was portrayed satirically on an episode of South Park.

During the 2014 campaign season, McConnell was lampooned for posting campaign B-roll footage online for use by allied PACs. Various Internet posters satirically interspersed the B-roll with footage from sitcoms and movies, and popular music. The practiceeither of posting B-roll footage online for usage by PACs, or of lampooning the B-rollwas termed "McConnelling".

In 2015 and 2019, Time listed McConnell as one of the 100 most influential people in the world.

In 2021, McConnell was named one of the US' top 'climate villains' by The Guardian.

See also

 2010s in United States political history
 Russian interference in the 2016 United States elections

References

Further reading

External links

 Senator Mitch McConnell official U.S. Senate website
 Mitch McConnell for Senate
 
 
 Mitch McConnell's file at Politifact

|-

|-

|-

|-

|-

|-

|-

|-

|-

|-

|-

|-

|-

|-

|-

|-

|-

 
1942 births
20th-century American lawyers
20th-century American politicians
21st-century American lawyers
21st-century American politicians
American people of Scotch-Irish descent
Baptists from Alabama
Baptists from Kentucky
County judges in Kentucky
DuPont Manual High School alumni
Federalist Society members
Kentucky lawyers
Kentucky Republicans
Living people
Military personnel from Kentucky
People from Sheffield, Alabama
People with polio
Politicians from Louisville, Kentucky
Sons of the American Revolution
Southern Baptists
United States congressional aides
Republican Party United States senators from Kentucky
University of Kentucky College of Law alumni
University of Louisville alumni
Activists for African-American civil rights
American people of English descent